The 2022–23 Cleveland State Vikings men's basketball team represented the Cleveland State University during the 2022–23 NCAA Division I men's basketball season. The Vikings, led by first-year head coach Daniyal Robinson, play their home games at the Wolstein Center as members of the Horizon League. They finished the season 19–12, 16–6 in Horizon League play to tie for second place. As the No. 3 seed in the Horizon League tournament, they defeated Robert Morris and Milwaukee before losing to Northern Kentucky in the conference championship game. The Vikings received an automatic bid to the College Basketball Invitational (CBI), where they lost in the first round in overtime to Eastern Kentucky.

Previous season 
The Vikings finished the 2021-22 season as Horizon League regular season co-champions with a record of 20–11, including 15–6 in conference play. They won in the opening round of the Horizon League tournament against tenth-seeded Robert Morris before losing to fourth seed Wright State. They received an invite to the 2022 National Invitation Tournament, where they lost in the first round to second-seeded Xavier.

Offseason

Departures

Incoming transfers

2022 recruiting class

Preseason 
The Vikings were picked to finish in seventh place in the Horizon League in the coaches' poll, receiving a total of 188 points.

Roster

Schedule and results

|-
!colspan=12 style=| Exhibition 

|-
!colspan=12 style=| Regular season 

|-
!colspan=9 style=| Horizon League tournament

|-
!colspan=12 style=| College Basketball Invitational

|-

Source

References 

Cleveland State Vikings men's basketball seasons
Cleveland State
Cleveland State
Cleveland State
Cleveland State